Kiev is the name of several ships:

Warships
 , a Project 1143  that was laid down in 1970, launched in 1972, and commissioned in 1975
 , a Project 1123M  that was cancelled in 1969 
 , a Project 48  that was cancelled due to World War II after being launched
 , a Project 38  that was renamed to Ordzhonikidze, Sergo Ordzhonikidze, and then finally, Baku; which served in World War II. 
 , a  coastal defense ship, later renamed Vice Admiral Popov, which served in the Russo-Turkish War.

Civilian ships
 , a passenger ship of Russia
 , a fishing vessel of Russia
 , a tug of Vietnam

See also

 Kiev class (disambiguation)
 Kiev (disambiguation)

References